Earley railway station serves the town of Earley in Berkshire, England. It is  down the line from  via Redhill. It is on the Waterloo to Reading Line, and forms the last stop before the terminus of the line at Reading.

The station has two side platforms, on either side of the twin track line. A large two-storey station building is situated on the Reading-bound (westernmost) platform. The two platforms are linked by a footbridge over the tracks, and the London-bound platform has a waiting room. The station is accessed by an approach road from the nearby main road between Reading and Wokingham, and on this approach is a terrace of three single storey cottages that were built for the South Eastern Railway at the same time as the station, to house railway staff and their families.

History
The South Eastern Railway (SER) opened Earley station in November 1863 on the former Reading, Guildford and Reigate Railway (RG&RR), which originally terminated at its own Reading Southern station. The RG&RR had opened on 4 July 1849 and the SER had taken it over in 1852.

By the time Earley station opened, the Staines, Wokingham & Woking Junction Railway (SW&WJR) was also operating a service between London Waterloo and Reading Southern station that used running powers over the SER through Earley station. The SW&WJR was absorbed by the London & South Western Railway (L&SWR) in 1878, and the L&SWR continued to operate over SER tracks until both railway companies became part of the Southern Railway in 1923.

In 1939, the line through Earley station was electrified, on the DC third rail system, as part of the electrification of the Reading to London Waterloo service. Trains on the original SER route to Guildford and Reigate continued to be steam hauled.

In 1948, the Southern Railway and the Great Western Railway (GWR), which also served Reading, were nationalised and merged with other newly nationalised railways to create British Railways. As a result of British Railways' 1955 Modernisation Plan, diesel traction replaced steam on the non-electrified services through Earley. In 1965, Reading Southern station closed, and the service was diverted into the adjacent, former GWR, Reading station.

Services
Great Western Railway trains between Reading and Gatwick Airport via Guildford pass through the station without stopping.

Gallery

References

Bibliography

External links

Borough of Wokingham
Railway stations in Berkshire
DfT Category D stations
Former South Eastern Railway (UK) stations
Railway stations in Great Britain opened in 1863
Railway stations served by South Western Railway